Gustav Lindau (2 May 1866 in Dessau – 10 October 1923 in Berlin), was a German mycologist and botanist.

Biography 
Gustav Lindau studied natural history in Heidelberg and Berlin, where he studied under Simon Schwendener (1829–1919). He completed his  doctoral thesis on the apothecia of  lichens in 1888. In 1890 he became director at the botanical garden in Münster and an assistant to Julius Oscar Brefeld (1839–1925).

In 1892 he became an assistant at the Berlin botanical garden. He obtained his habilitation in 1894, and became a professor in 1902. He has been credited for having introduced the term "" to refer to fungal tissue in an 1899 publication, which he proposed could be further adapted for specific tissue types by adding prefixes such as "" and "".

The genus Lindauea (Acanthaceae) was named in his honor by Rendle, (it is now a synonym of Lepidagathis ),  and the fungi genus Lindauella was named after him by Heinrich Rehm in 1900. The fungus genus Lindauomyces, named by Koorders in 1907, is now a synonym of Arthrobotryum

Works 
 Gustav Lindau and Paul Sydow: Thesaurus literaturae mycologicae et lichenologicae. (1908–1917, 5 volumes)
 Gustav Lindau: Kryptogamenflora für Anfanger ("Cryptogam flora for Beginners"). (1911–1914, 6 volumes)

Literature 
 Heinrich Dörfelt (ed.):Encyclopedia of mycology. Gustav Fischer Verlag, Stuttgart, New York, 1989. 
 Zander, R. in Dictionary of Plant Names ed. 13, Ulmer Verlag, Stuttgart,1984. ))

See also
 :Category:Taxa named by Gustav Lindau

References

Note 
Based in part on the translation from the German Wikipedia.

Botanists with author abbreviations
1866 births
1923 deaths
19th-century German botanists
German mycologists
Humboldt University of Berlin alumni
People from Dessau-Roßlau
20th-century German botanists